A Better Class of Person (1981) is an autobiography written by dramatist John Osborne and published in 1981. Based on Osborne's childhood and early life, it ends with the first performance of Look Back in Anger at the Royal Court Theatre in 1956. A sequel, Almost a Gentleman, was published in 1991.

The book recounts Osborne's childhood and youth, emphasising his warm relationship with his father, and his antagonistic relationship with his mother, which deepened to hatred after his father died when John was ten.

Dramatic version
The autobiography was preceded by a screenplay entitled Too Young to Fight, Too Old to Forget, which was filmed by Thames TV in July 1985 under the title A Better Class of Person. It was directed by Frank Cvitanovich, with Eileen Atkins and Alan Howard as Osborne's parents and Gary Capelin and Neil McPherson as Osborne. The television film was nominated for the Prix Italia.

References

1985 films
1985 drama films
British drama films
Literary autobiographies
1980s English-language films
1980s British films